Vice Admiral Alister Francis Beal CB CMG DSO (21 March 1875 – 18 October 1962) was a Royal Navy officer who became Commodore Commanding the New Zealand Division.

Naval career
Beal joined the Royal Navy as a 13-year-old on 15 July 1888. He was commissioned as a midshipman in 1894 and served in World War I becoming commanding officer of the cruiser HMS Weymouth in February 1918 and being awarded the DSO for his services at the bombardment of Durazzo in October 1918. He went on to Command HMS Chatham (which had been lent to the New Zealand Station) in July 1923 before becoming Commodore Commanding the New Zealand Division in August 1923 until he retired in 1926. He was appointed a Companion of the Order of the Bath in the 1926 King's Birthday Honours and promoted to Vice-Admiral while on the retired list.

Beal was appointed as an Officer of the French Legion of Honour while serving on HMS Weymouth. He was awarded the Italian Silver Medal of Military Valor for operations at Durazzo on 2 October 1918.

Family
He was married to Mabel Constance Annie Youl.

References

1875 births
1962 deaths
Royal Navy vice admirals
Companions of the Order of the Bath
Companions of the Order of St Michael and St George
Companions of the Distinguished Service Order
Recipients of the Silver Medal of Military Valor
Officiers of the Légion d'honneur
Scottish military personnel
Royal Navy officers of World War I